Archaeoseismology is the study of past earthquakes deriving from the analysis of archaeological sites. Such analyses reveal information about seismic events that have not been historically recorded. Such data can also help to document seismic risk in areas subject to extremely destructive earthquakes. In 1991, an international conference held in Athens marked the beginning of modern research in the field of archaeoseismology, described as a "study of ancient earthquakes, and their social, cultural, historical and natural effects".

The main idea
Earthquakes that happened during the far past hide a particularly important information for a regional seismic risk assessment. We have quantitative data concerning past earthquakes only from the beginning of the 20 century (as the invention of the seismograph is from the very late 19 century), but humanity is forced to deal with earthquakes since the very beginning of its time. So, we have an extremely limited information to deal with a reliable seismic risk. As a result, a methodology for reconstruction of historical earthquakes was held during the 20 century, but it has brought a very partial results, especially for archaic earthquakes. Then, it became clear, that research in archaeological sites are needed in aim to identify damages or destructions that are Attributable to ancient earthquakes.

Archeological record
The archaeological record can carry three different types of evidence of seismic activity:
 The archaeological remains are displaced due to the movement of an active fault.
 The remains and artefacts contained in destruction deposits, associated with the decline of soil or seismic vibration, can be used the dating of earthquake damage. Other archaeological evidence, such as repairs, abandonment of an archaeological site or architectural changes, can help in identifying ancient earthquakes.
 Αncient buildings and other man-made structures can be studied for signs of ancient seismic disaster, often associated with soil vibration.

Notable Events 

 A key example of earthquake in history is the 226 BC Rhodes earthquake which toppled one the seven wonders of the world at the time, The Colossus of Rhodes. It is also noted that damage to the city and harbor were evident. The Greek historian Strabo discussed the collapse of the colossus in the 1st century BC.
 A more studied example is The Great Chilean Earthquake of 1960 which was the most powerful earthquake in recorded history at 9.6 on the moment magnitude scale.
 The first recorded earthquake was the Mount Tai earthquake in China in 1831 BC.

See also 
 Paleoseismology
Historical earthquakes

References

External links

 
Archaeological sub-disciplines